Richard Malcolm Smith (born 6 June 1973) is a former rugby union player who played scrum-half for Ebbw Vale RFC, Sale Sharks, Worcester Warriors, Newport RFC, Bristol Rugby, Cardiff RFC, Newbridge RFC, Merthyr RFC and Cardiff Blues. He was a regular in the Wales 22 but only gained one Wales cap as he was being overlooked for Robert Howley and Rupert Moon. He is well known for using the box kick to relieve the pressure posed by the opposition and to also gain territory.  He was a very skilful, technical and intelligent rugby player with excellent game management.

When he joined Cardiff RFC former coach Dai Young said

Notes

Rugby union players from Pontypool
1973 births
Rugby union scrum-halves
Welsh rugby union players
Wales international rugby union players
Living people
Newport RFC players
Ebbw Vale RFC players
Cardiff RFC players